Elections to Norwich City Council were held on 2 May 2019. Following boundary changes, all 39 seats were put up for election, with three councillors being elected per ward using the block vote system. The election saw the Green Party reclaim five seats from the Labour Party, while the Labour Party retained its majority on the council.

Background

In the 2018 election, the Labour Party achieved its best result in the city since the 1990s, winning 49% of the vote and 12 of 13 seats up for election, with the Greens dropping to their worst percentage result since 2004 (19%) and losing all 5 seats they were defending. This followed a similar victory for Labour within Norwich in the 2017 Norfolk County Council election and the 2017 re-election of Norwich South Labour MP Clive Lewis with 61% of the vote. As a result of the 2018 election, Labour held 31 of the 39 seats - 79.5% of the total.

In late 2017, the Local Government Boundary Commission began a review of the Norwich City Council boundaries.

All councillors had to seek reelection in the 2019 Norwich City Council election, on changed boundaries, rather than the usual third of each ward.

Summary

Results summary

Council Composition

Prior to the election the composition of the council was:

The results were as follows:

Ward results

Bowthorpe

Catton Grove

Crome

Eaton

Lakenham

Mancroft

Mile Cross

Nelson

Sewell

Thorpe Hamlet

Town Close

University

Wensum

References

2019 English local elections
2019
2010s in Norfolk
May 2019 events in the United Kingdom